Hiranand Sastri (1878–1946) was an Indian archaeologist, epigraphist and official of the Archaeological Survey of India who was involved in the excavation of numerous sites including Nalanda, and Sankissa. His son, Sachchidananda Vatsyayan 'Agyeya', was the Hindi language poet and writer.

Early life
Sastri was born in 1878 in Punjab. He graduated from D.A.V. College, Lahore, winning Gold Medal for standing first in the BA examination in Sanskrit and English subjects. He obtained a MA from Oriental College, Lahore (under Punjab University), and again won Gold Medal.

Career
Sastri started his career as a professor of Sanskrit and Philosophy at D.A.V. College, and later, he became reader in Sanskrit at the Punjab University, teaching Sanskrit and Comparative Philology. He passed the Honours Examination in Sanskrit and received the Master of Oriental Learning (MOL).

He joined the Archaeological Survey of India (ASI) in 1903 and was appointed as an assistant archaeologist surveyor in the Northern Circle. Soon after, he was deputed by John Marshall, the then director general of ASI, to survey some archaeological sites in the Ganga-Yamuna doab, where he found some copper hoard objects. He explored and surveyed sites in Uttar Pradesh and Himachal Pradesh including Rajpur Parasu, Bithoor, Parihar, Kullu, Mandi and Suket.

He was promoted as the Assistant Archaeologist, Librarian and Curator of the Nagpur Government Museum in 1906. He was sent to Harappa in 1909.

On 16 September 1925, he was appointed as the government epigraphist for India. He held the post till 10 October 1933. He edited some volumes of Epigraphia Indica, the official publication of ASI.

He died on 4 August 1946 in Gurdaspur.

Recognition
The Punjab University awarded him the Doctor of Literature for his work Bhasa and the Authorship of the Thirteen Trivandrum Plays. The Baroda State awarded him the title of Jñānaratna.

Selected works
 Nālandā and Its Epigraphic Material, 1942, Issue 66 of Memoirs of the Archaeological Survey of India
 A guide to Elephanta, 1934, Kanak Publications
 The Ruins Of Dabhoi Or Darbhavati In Baroda State,1940,Gaekwads Archaeological Series

References

External links
 
 

1878 births
1946 deaths
20th-century Indian archaeologists
Archaeological Survey of India people
Archaeologists in British India